"Magic" is a single by Dutch three-piece girl group O'G3NE. The song was released in the Netherlands as a digital download on 13 December 2014 through 8ball TV. The song peaked at number 3 on the Dutch Singles Chart. The song is included on the Special Edition of their third studio album We Got This.

Track listing

Chart performance

Weekly charts

Release history

References

2014 songs
2014 singles
O'G3NE songs